Zyryanka West Airport is an airport in Russia, located  west of Zyryanka, Verkhnekolymsky District in the Sakha Republic of Russia. It was built during World War II for the Alaska-Siberian (ALSIB) air route used to ferry American Lend-Lease aircraft to the Eastern Front.
It is now barely used, when main Zyryanka Airport cannot be used.

Airlines and destinations

References

Airports built in the Soviet Union
Airports in the Sakha Republic